In Greek mythology, Naxos or Naxus ( or /naksos/; Ancient Greek: Νάξος Náxos) may refer to three possible eponyms of the island of Naxos: 

 Naxos, son of Endymion and thus, possibly the brother of Aetolus, Paeon, Epeius and Eurycyda.
 Naxos, son of Apollo and Acacallis, daughter of Minos. His brothers could be Cydon, Amphithemis, Oaxes, Miletus, Phylacides and Phylander who were called offspring of Apollo and Acacallis.
 Naxos, son of Polemon and father of Leucippus. When the Carians coming from Latmia moved to the island of Strongyle (old name for Naxos) and making it their home, they made Naxos an upright and famous man to be their king.

Notes

References 

 Diodorus Siculus, The Library of History translated by Charles Henry Oldfather. Twelve volumes. Loeb Classical Library. Cambridge, Massachusetts: Harvard University Press; London: William Heinemann, Ltd. 1989. Vol. 3. Books 4.59–8. Online version at Bill Thayer's Web Site
 Diodorus Siculus, Bibliotheca Historica. Vol 1-2. Immanel Bekker. Ludwig Dindorf. Friedrich Vogel. in aedibus B. G. Teubneri. Leipzig. 1888–1890. Greek text available at the Perseus Digital Library.
Pausanias, Description of Greece with an English Translation by W.H.S. Jones, Litt.D., and H.A. Ormerod, M.A., in 4 Volumes. Cambridge, MA, Harvard University Press; London, William Heinemann Ltd. 1918. . Online version at the Perseus Digital Library
Pausanias, Graeciae Descriptio. 3 vols. Leipzig, Teubner. 1903.  Greek text available at the Perseus Digital Library.
Stephanus of Byzantium, Stephani Byzantii Ethnicorum quae supersunt, edited by August Meineike (1790-1870), published 1849. A few entries from this important ancient handbook of place names have been translated by Brady Kiesling. Online version at the Topos Text Project.

Children of Apollo
Princes in Greek mythology